21062 Iasky, provisional designation , is a dark background asteroid from the outer regions of the asteroid belt, approximately  in diameter. It was discovered on 13 May 1991, by American astronomers Carolyn and Eugene Shoemaker at the Palomar Observatory in California. It was named for Australian geophysicist Robert Iasky.

Orbit and classification 

Iasky is a non-family asteroid from the main belt's background population. It orbits the Sun in the outer asteroid belt at a distance of 2.9–3.1 AU once every 5 years and 4 months (1,940 days; semi-major axis of 3.04 AU). Its orbit has an eccentricity of 0.03 and an inclination of 24° with respect to the ecliptic. The body's observation arc begins in November 1982, with its first observations taken by the Siding Spring Observatory and published with the Digitized Sky Survey later on.

Naming 

This minor planet was named after Australian geophysicist Robert Iasky (born 1956), who discovered the 120-kilometer-sized Woodleigh crater in the Carnarvon Basin of Western Australia while working with the Geological Survey of Western Australia. The official  was published by the Minor Planet Center on 1 May 2003.

Physical characteristics 

According to the survey carried out by the NEOWISE mission of NASA's Wide-field Infrared Survey Explorer, Iasky measures 19.034 kilometers in diameter and its surface has an albedo of 0.063, which is typical for a carbonaceous C-type asteroid. As of 2018, no rotational lightcurve of Iasky has been obtained from photometric observations. The body's rotation period, pole and shape remain unknown.

In literature 

Asteroid 1991JW has an orbit very much like the Earth's and is even easier to get to than 4660 Nereus. But its orbit seems too similar to the Earth's for it to be a natural object. Perhaps it's some lost upper stage of the Saturn V Apollo moon rocket".
This is however quite mysterious, as the orbit of 20162 Iasky is located in the outer asteroid belt.

References

External links 
 Dictionary of Minor Planet Names, Google books
 Discovery Circumstances: Numbered Minor Planets (20001)-(25000) – Minor Planet Center
 
 

021062
Discoveries by Carolyn S. Shoemaker
Discoveries by Eugene Merle Shoemaker
Named minor planets
19910513